Thomas Grubb (4 August 1800 – 16 September 1878) was an Irish optician and founder of the Grubb Telescope Company.

He was born near Portlaw, County Waterford, Ireland, the son of William Grubb Junior, a prosperous Quaker farmer and his second wife, Eleanor Fayle.

Thomas started out in 1830 in Dublin as a metal billiard-table manufacturer.  He diversified into making telescopes and erected a public observatory near his factory at 1 Upper Charlemont Street, Portobello, Dublin.  As makers of some of the largest and best-known telescopes of the Victorian era, the company was at the forefront of optical and mechanical engineering. His innovations for large telescopes included clock-driven polar mounts, whiffletree mirror mounting cells and Cassegrain reflector optics. Later, the manufacturing firm changed its name to Grubb-Parsons in 1925.

Grubb helped build the famous telescope for William Parsons, 3rd Earl of Rosse, at Parsonstown (now known as Birr), County Offaly, Ireland.  One of his earliest instruments - the telescope for Markree Observatory in County Sligo in the West of Ireland, supplied in 1834 - was, until 1839, the largest refracting telescope in the world. It was used to sketch Halley's comet in 1835 and to view the solar eclipse of 15 May 1836.
 
Later he built telescopes for observatories worldwide, including Aldershot Observatory, Melbourne, Vienna, Madrid and Mecca and others.

Thomas died in 1878 in Monkstown, County Dublin, Ireland. He is buried at Mount Jerome Cemetery, Dublin, Ireland. He had married Sarah Palmer. Their youngest son was Sir Howard Grubb, who took over the optical business. Thomas Grubb's cousin, John Grubb Richardson (1813 - 1891) was a major Irish industrialist who founded the model village of Bessbrook.

References

External links 
 
Grubb Telescope Company
List of Grubb telescopes 

1800 births
1878 deaths
Irish inventors
People from County Waterford
Lens designers
Telescope manufacturers
Irish astronomers
Burials at Mount Jerome Cemetery and Crematorium
Fellows of the Royal Society